Canyons of the Ancients National Monument is a national monument protecting an archaeologically-significant landscape located in the southwestern region of the U.S. state of Colorado. The monument's   are managed by the Bureau of Land Management, as directed in the Presidential proclamation which created the site on June 9, 2000. Canyons of the Ancients National Monument is part of the National Landscape Conservation System, better known as the National Conservation Lands. This system  comprises 32 million acres managed by the Bureau of Land Management to conserve, protect, and restore these nationally significant landscapes recognized for their outstanding cultural, ecological, and scientific values.<ref>[http://www.blm.gov/wo/st/en/prog/blm_special_areas/NLCS.html "National Conservation Lands]  Bureau of Land Management. Retrieved 5-2-2016.</ref> Canyons of the Ancients encompasses and surrounds three of the four separate sections of Hovenweep National Monument, which is administered by the National Park Service. The monument was proclaimed in order to preserve the largest concentration of archaeological sites in the United States, primarily Ancestral Puebloan ruins. As of 2022, over 8,500 individual archeological sites had been documented within the monument.

Geography
Canyons of the Ancients National Monument is located 9 miles west of Pleasant View, Colorado in southwestern Colorado.Gregory, Lee. Colorado Scenic Guide: Southern Region. Johnson Books, Boulder, Colorado, 1996 (1st edition 1984). pp. 17-18. .  The monument's northern and eastern boundaries are canyons. Its western boundary is the Colorado-Utah state border and the reservation of the Navajo Nation.  Lands south are bordered by the Ute Mountain Reservation and McElmo Creek.

History

Canyons of the Ancients residents

Developmental Pueblo: AD 500 to 1100
Ancient Pueblo people lived in the Canyons of the Ancients in the 10th century; Lowry Pueblo, built during the Great Pueblo period, was built atop pit-house built in the 10th century.

For a fuller understanding of the architecture and life style during this period, pueblo buildings in the Mesa Verde region were built with stone, windows facing south, and in U, E and L shapes.  The buildings were located more closely together and reflected deepening religious celebration.  Towers were built near kivas and likely used for look-outs. Pottery became more versatile, including pitchers, ladles, bowls, jars and tableware for food and drink. White pottery with black designs emerged, the pigments coming from plants.  Water management and conservation techniques, including the use of reservoirs and silt-retaining dams also emerged during this period.

Great Pueblo period: AD 1100 to 1300
As refinements in construction techniques increased, the Puebloans built larger pueblos, or villages, on top of the pit-houses starting about AD 1090.  Lowry Pueblo had just a few rooms and 2 kivas in 1090 and the village was expanded two times about 1103 and 1120 until it had 40 rooms, 8 kivas and one great kiva.

Like their ancient neighbors at Hovenweep National Monument and Mesa Verde National Park, the Lowry Pueblo dwellers were farmers and hunters.  They grew beans, corn and squash and raised turkeys.  They also made and decorated pottery.

Notable sites
At least 8,500 distinct structures have been identified in the monument, and the density of archeological remains is the highest of any region in the United States. The vast majority of stone structures in the national monument are from the Ancient Puebloans era.

More than 30,000 sites likely exist in the Monument, in some places more than 200 sites per square mile.  After building basic pit style structures at first, the Puebloans later built villages with cliff dwellings.   Archaeological ruins also include Sweat lodges, kivas, shrines and petroglyphs.  Reservoirs with stone and earthen dams, including spillways and also numerous check dams,Canyons of the Ancients: Background.  Bureau of Land Management. Retrieved 9-24-2011. built in case of flash floods.  Stone towers which may have been lookout or sentry posts, are found scattered throughout the monument.

Migration
Unlike other Ancient Pueblo site abandonment, it appears that the people of the Canyons of the Ancients left the sites much earlier than their neighbors, some time in the mid-12th century.  Some of the artifacts found from the site show a connection to the Chacoan culture, while others are similar to those of the Mesa Verde dwellers.

Other Ancient Pueblo people from the area migrated south to Arizona and New Mexico, ancestors to modern pueblo people such as the Hopi and Zuni. Modern Pueblo people are located on reservations primarily in New Mexico, but some in Arizona.  The 60,000 people's pueblos and reservations reside in three geographic areas:
 along the upper Rio Grande in New Mexico, such as Taos Pueblo
 southern New Mexican Zuni, Acoma, Laguna and Isleta pueblos and reservations
 Arizona Hopi.

Post-Pueblo Native American tribes: 14th to 18th century
After 1300, hunter-gatherers, ancestors of the Ute and Navajo, moved into the southwestern Colorado and southeastern Utah and came to inhabit the region.  
 The ancestors to the Navajo were one of the tribes of the southern division of the Athabaskan language family that migrated south from Alaska and northwestern Canada, most likely traveling through the Great Basin. The Navajo ancestors were in the area after AD 1300, but at least by the early 16th century.
 The people from who the Ute descended arrived in the area from the west in this period from 1300 to the 18th century.What Other Indian Tribe is Related to the Navajo? Crow Canyon Archaeological Center. 2011. Retrieved 9-26-2011.  The Ute's ancestors are hunter-gatherers who, in the 12th century, began migrating east from the present southern California area into a large hunter-gathering territory as far east as the Great Plains and in the canyons and mountains of eastern Utah and Colorado.
 
During this period, the Spanish colonial reach extended to northern New Mexico, where they settled in the 16th century.  They introduced items for trade, such as guns and horses, new and deadly diseases, and cultural influence in the forms of religion, language, and forms of government.  In the 18th century, Spanish missionaries visited the area looking for a route to Spanish missions in California.  One of the expeditions was that of Spanish friars Silvestre Vélez de Escalante and Francisco Atanasio Domínguez who traveled from New Mexico, through western Colorado to Utah.

European and American settlement: 19th century to present
The first Anglo American people arrived in the early 19th century, starting with trappers.  With the discovery of precious ores in the last decades of the 19th Century, miners and other settlers moved into the region.  By the mid-19th century, the United States government and Native American tribes were at war over land ownership.  People were forced to leave their homelands.  The Navajo had moved south and the Ute territory was significantly reduced.

Excavation and restoration
Lowry Pueblo was excavated between 1930-1934 by Paul S. Martin of the Field Museum of Natural History and went through a restoration process in 1965.  Two years later, it was named a National Historic Landmark and was listed on the National Register of Historic places.Wilson, D. Ray (1990) Colorado Historical Tour Guide. Carpentersville, IL: Crossroads Communications. p. 374. .

National monument

Canyons of the Ancients National Monument

The U.S. Bureau of Land Management administers the monument and enforces regulations balancing resource protection with land conservation.  It was created by executive proclamation in 2000 with the intention of protecting the archaeological, natural and geological resources. Facilities at the Lowry Pueblo include parking, a picnic area, toilet and trail.  Sand Canyon Pueblo also has a trail, which leads to McElmo Canyon.

While other national monuments in the Southwest, including Hovenweep, were limited to the area around major ruins, "Canyons of the Ancients was perhaps the first to explicitly recognize that ruins do not tell the entire story—that ancients lived in, hunted, gathered and raised crops, and developed water and religious sites throughout the larger landscape,” according to Secretary of the Interior Bruce Babbitt.

Wilderness study areas

There are three Wilderness study areas in the monument:
 Cahone Canyon, located about 4 miles southwest of the town of Cahone, Colorado, is about 9,156 acres.
 Cross Canyon, located south of Cahone Canyon, about 14 miles southwest of the town of Cahone, Colorado, is about 12,721 acres, 1,008 acres cross into Utah.
 Squaw/Papoose Canyon is located about 12 miles south of Dove Creek and is about 11,357 acres, 6,676 acres cross into Utah.

Anasazi Heritage Center and Canyons of the Ancients visitor center

The Anasazi Heritage Center is also the visitor center for the Canyons of the Ancients National Monument and includes artifacts from the monument, a museum with interactive exhibits, a library and a theatre.  Information is available there regarding the Ancient Puebloan culture, Trail of the Ancients Byway and the Canyons of the Ancients National Monument.

Vandalism

Vandalism and treasure hunting are difficult to minimize due to an inadequate number of federal employees and law enforcement personnel to monitor and prosecute those who deface ruins or steal archeological remains. Thousands of undocumented artifacts have been removed from the monument and now reside in private collections. A news article in July 2006 reported that funding for the monument had decreased by almost 40% since 2004, and that a particularly severe looting episode occurred in January 2006.

Natural resources

Geology and topography

These surfaces are upheld by sedimentary rocks of Cretaceous age that are mostly covered by much younger gravel and sand layers deposited in the last several million years. The oldest rocks are exposed in McElmo Canyon and are sedimentary layers of Jurassic age. In and near the Monument, these sedimentary rocks have been bent upwards to form a dome, the McElmo Dome: most of the Jurassic rocks are below the surface in the regions immediately bordering the area. The southern boundary of much of the Monument lies just north of McElmo Creek.

Formations from the Cretaceous and Jurassic periods

The following description of the geology of the Monument is derived mostly from contributions to Anderson et al. (1997), unless otherwise referenced. The nomenclature of the rock units here may not represent the present consensus.

Carboniferous Period

Carbon dioxide is produced from rocks of Mississippian age (Carboniferous Period
The dome contains one of the largest deposits of carbon dioxide in the United States, and the extracted gas is used for enhanced oil recovery. This carbon dioxide reservoir has been studied to learn about possible underground storage (carbon sequestration) of carbon dioxide.

Oil and gas exploration
In 1986, the area was designated as the Anasazi Area of Critical Environmental Concern by the Bureau of Land Management to ensure there are no new leases for oil and gas industry; Leases will only be given to promote the conservation of oil and gas resources.

85% of the monument was under lease by ranchers and oil and gas exploration entities in 2000.  With only 2,000 acres of monument land that is not leased, and that land home to ancient archaeological sites and wildlife habitat, four environmental groups have been active to ensure there is no further oil and gas exploration and extraction. However, off-road vehicles and an increase in road construction for oil and gas exploration, allow greater access to archeological areas. Large trucks known as "thumpers" were found searching for oil and gas pockets by pounding the earth and recording the seismic data, having received a green light from the Bureau of Land Management.  Executive Director of the San Juan Citizens Alliance, Mark Pearson stated:

The decision showed a blatant disregard for the proclamation [that states that leases should only be made to protect and preserve oil and gas resources]. That does not bode well for the future management for the rest of this monument or any monument in the country.

In 2006, the National Trust for Historic Preservation reported that the nation's push for energy resources on federal land is occurring at a cost of archaeological and cultural resources at Canyons of the Ancients National Monument and Utah's Nine Mile Canyon.  The National Trust further asserted that the Bureau of Land Management has only documented 17 million acres of the 262 under its stewardship.

Ken Salazar, Secretary of Interior, said in 2009:

With an emphasis on conservation, protection and restoration, the National Landscape Conservation System and Canyons of the Ancients National Monument represent a new era of management for the BLM. After 130 years of exploration and research identifying tens of thousands of irreplaceable and fragile archaeological sites, we know that Canyons of the Ancients represents the best of our cultural heritage. Using an army of volunteers who contribute on the ground services and applying the principles of balanced management and science-based decision-making, this crown jewel preserves ancestral homes and landscapes for Native American citizens and for children and communities throughout the United States.

Wildlife
The Monument is home to a wide variety of desert wildlife, some of which are the American kestrels, Gambel's quail, Golden eagles, Long-Nosed Leopard lizard, Mesa Verde nightsnake, mourning dove, Peregrine falcons, Red-tailed hawks the Twin-spotted Spiny Lizard.  Mammals that pass through the riparian and piñon-juniper woodland are jackrabbits, Mule deer, ringtail, fox, muskrat, beaver and bobcat.

Wildlife and plant habitat are threatened by increased road and building construction by oil and gas interests.

 Gallery 

See also

List of national monuments of the United States
Other neighboring Ancient Pueblo sites in Colorado
 Anasazi Heritage Center
 Crow Canyon Archaeological Center
 Hovenweep National Monument
 Mesa Verde National Park
Other cultures in the Four Corners region
 Trail of the Ancients
 List of ancient dwellings of Pueblo peoples
Early cultures
 Ancestral Puebloans
 List of prehistoric sites in Colorado
 Oasisamerica cultures
 Outline of Colorado prehistory
 Paleo-Indians

 Notes 

 References 

Further reading
 Anderson, O. J., Kues, B. S., and Lucas, S. G. (editors) (1997) Mesozoic Geology and Paleontology of the Four Corners Region.'' New Mexico Geological Society Forty-Eighth Annual Field Conference.
 Gerhardt, K. M., Lacey, P. F., McBride, R., and McBride, D. Raw lithic material sources near the Greenlee Site. Retrieved May, 2009.
 Gibbon, Guy E.; Ames, Kenneth M. (1998) Archaeology of Prehistoric Native America: An Encyclopedia.  .

External links

Canyons of the Ancients National Monument (Bureau of Land Management)
Canyons of the Ancients National Monument Recreational Map
Crow Canyon Archaeological Center, Describes sites in the Monument

National Monuments in Colorado
Bureau of Land Management National Monuments
Bureau of Land Management areas in Colorado
Ancient Puebloan archaeological sites in Colorado
Native American history of Colorado
Protected areas of Dolores County, Colorado
Protected areas of Montezuma County, Colorado
Oasisamerica cultures
Puebloan buildings and structures
Ruins in the United States
Archaeological sites on the National Register of Historic Places in Colorado
National Register of Historic Places in Montezuma County, Colorado
2000 establishments in Colorado
Protected areas established in 2000
Units of the National Landscape Conservation System